Suyu-dong is a dong, neighbourhood of Gangbuk-gu in Seoul, South Korea. From June 30 of 2008, six administrative Suyu-dongs were divided to Insu-dong (Suyu 5 and 6 dong), Ui-dong (Suyu 4-dong), and Suyu-dong (Suyu 1, 2, and 3 dong).

History 
It was previously known as Suyu-ri (Suyu Village), and was a part of Goyang County, Gyeonggi Province. In 1949 it became a part of Seongbuk District, and was reclassified from a ri to a dong in 1950. In 1973, it was one of the dong that was split off from Seongbuk District to form Dobong District, and then in 1995 it was reassigned to its present Gangbuk District.

See also 
Administrative divisions of South Korea

References

External links
Gangbuk-gu official website
Gangbuk-gu map at the Gangbuk-gu official website
 Suyu 1-dong resident office website
 Suyu 2-dong resident office website
 Suyu 3-dong resident office website

Neighbourhoods of Gangbuk District